The 2021–22 season is the 95th season of competitive association football and first season in the English Football League played by Sutton United Football Club, a professional football club based in Sutton in the London Borough of Sutton, England. They won, and were therefore promoted from, the National League in 2020–21 to earn entry into the EFL League Two. The club will also play in this season's edition of the FA Cup; and for the first time, in the EFL Cup and EFL Trophy. The season will run from 1 July 2021 to 30 June 2022.

Background

The 2020–21 season was Matt Gray's second full season as Sutton United manager, having taken over the role in May 2019. Sutton finished the season as champions of the 2020–21 National League to gain promotion out of non-League football for the first time in the club's 123-year history, and into League Two, the fourth tier of the English football league system.

As EFL rules require that all matches have to be played on grass surfaces, Sutton began work on tearing up their artificial pitch at Gander Green Lane in order to meet the requirements on 31 May 2020.

Pre-season
Sutton United announced they would have friendlies against Brentford XI, Chesham United, Maidstone United, Haringey Borough, Aldershot Town, Dartford and Barnet as part of the club's pre-season preparations.

On 12 July, it was announced the scheduled friendly against Brentford XI was off due to players coming into contact with an individual testing positive for COVID-19, the club confirmed they would travel to face Chesham United instead. On 15 July, the upcoming game against Maidstone United was called off due to a positive COVID-19 test result in the Sutton squad.

Competitions

Overall Record

League Two

League table

Results summary

Results by matchday

Matches
Sutton's full league fixture were released on 24 June 2021.

FA Cup

Sutton United were drawn away to Hayes & Yeading United in the first round.

EFL Cup

U's were drawn away to Cardiff City in the first round.

EFL Trophy

United were drawn into the group stages alongside AFC Wimbledon, Crystal Palace U21s and Portsmouth. The group stage fixtures were announced on July 15.

Transfers

Transfers in

Loans in

Transfers out

Loans out

Squad statistics

Appearances

Goals

Assists

Clean sheets

Disciplinary record

Notes

References

Sutton United
Sutton United F.C. seasons
Sutton United
Sutton United